Intelligence community may refer to:

 Australian Intelligence Community (AIC)
 Bangladeshi intelligence community
 Croatian security and intelligence system         
 Israeli intelligence community 
 Italian intelligence agencies
 New Zealand intelligence community, see New Zealand intelligence agencies
 Pakistani intelligence community, see List of Pakistani intelligence agencies
 Russian Intelligence Community
 French intelligence agencies
 United Kingdom intelligence agencies, List of intelligence agencies of the United Kingdom
 United States Intelligence Community

See also
 List of (worldwide) intelligence agencies